Serrabrycon magoi is a species of characin endemic to Venezuela.  This species is the only known member of its genus.

References
 

Characidae
Monotypic fish genera
Fish of South America
Taxa named by Richard Peter Vari
Fish described in 1986